National Highway 752I, commonly referred to as NH 752I is a national highway in  India. It is a spur road of National Highway 52. NH-752I traverses the state Maharashtra in India.

Route 

Kopargaon, Vaijapur, Lasur, Aurangabad, Jalana Watur, Mantha, Jintur, Aunda Nagnath, Basmat, Ardhapur, Tamsa, Himayatnagar, Dhanki Phulsawangi, Mahur, Dhanoda.

Junctions  

  Terminal near Kopargaon.
  near Dhanoda.
  near Jintur

See also 

 List of National Highways in India
 List of National Highways in India by state

References

External links 

 NH 752I on OpenStreetMap

National highways in India
National Highways in Maharashtra